Puttanavari Palli is a village in Pullampeta mandal in Kadapa district in the state of Andhra Pradesh in India.

See also
 Pullampeta

References

Villages in Kadapa district